Avtepe  or Agios Symeon ( "Saint Simon", previously known as  in Turkish) is a village in Cyprus, located on the Karpas Peninsula. It is under the de facto control of Northern Cyprus. As of 2011, Agios Symeon had a population of 119. It has always been inhabited by Turkish Cypriots.

References

Communities in Famagusta District
Populated places in İskele District